Valva may refer to:

In geography:
Valva (city), an ancient city in L'Aquila province, Italy
Valva (mountain), a mountain in North Africa
Valva, Campania, a commune in Salerno province, Italy

In biology:
Valva, a clasping structure in some animals
Valva (moth), a genus of moths in the family Pyralidae